The Sebkha Azzel Matti is an endorheic basin in central Algeria, North Africa.

References

Endorheic basins of Africa
Landforms of Algeria